Scuticaria hadwenii is a species of orchid occurring from Guyana to Brazil.

References

External links 

hadwenii
Orchids of Brazil
Orchids of Guyana